Rhoda Truax Silberman (October 28, 1901 – June 29, 2000) was an American author.

Biography
Born Rhoda Truax in New York City to Justice Charles Henry Truax of the New York State Supreme Court and his wife, Caroline Sanders, she was a graduate of the Horace Mann School and Barnard College in New York City. She was the sister of arts administrator and cookbook author and editor, Carol Truax. Rhoda Truax married twice, firstly to Dr Robert Henry Aldrich of Boston in 1924 and later, to Henry R. Silberman, a businessman of Boston, in 1955. 

Truax wrote 12 novels and historical books, the best known being The Doctors Warren of Boston, published by Houghton Mifflin in 1968. She had lived in Colorado Springs since 1992 and prior to that was a resident of Cambridge, Massachusetts for many decades.

Selected published works
 Hospital, E.P. Dutton and Co, 1932
 Doctors Carry the Keys, E.P. Dutton and Co, 1933
 Barry Scott, M.D: A novel, E.P. Dutton, 1935
 The Accident Ward Mystery, Little, Brown and Co, Boston, 1937 (Hardcover)
 This Dynasty of Doctors, Bobbs-Merrill Company Inc, Indianapolis, 1940
 Green is the Golden Tree, Bobbs-Merril, Indianapolis, 1943
 Joseph Lister, Father of Modern Surgery, Bobbs Merrill, Indianapolis and New York, 1944
 The Doctors Jacobi, Little, Brown and Co, Boston, 1952
 True Adventures of Doctors (with Paul Galdone), Grosset and Dunlap, New York, 1954 (Hardcover, illustrated)
 With Equal Grace, Bobbs-Merrill, Indianapolis, 1964
 The Doctors Warren of Boston: First Family of Surgery, Houghton Mifflin, Boston, 1968 (Hardcover)

References

1901 births
2000 deaths
20th-century American novelists
20th-century American women writers
American women novelists
Barnard College alumni
Horace Mann School alumni
Novelists from New York (state)
Writers from New York City